Gripsholm is a 2000 Swiss film directed by Xavier Koller based on the Kurt Tucholsky's novel Schloss Gripsholm and reflection into final part of his real life.

From Xavier's own words, "The subject of the story is partly the autobiographical story of the aggressive publisher Kurt (Tucholsky), who in the year 1932 travels to Sweden together with his girlfriend Lydia, whom he calls "Princess". Variety singer Billie and air-pilot Karlchen follow later on to join-up with the couple. There now begins a sensuous life and games of love in the last summer before the national socialists take over power in Germany. Kurt loves his friends who have abandoned him, as well as his girlfriend who loves him but nevertheless returns home. One tries to forget the troubles and hopes, in the face of the threatening catastrophe, to retain a certain innocence."

It was Switzerland's submission to the 73rd Academy Awards for the Academy Award for Best Foreign Language Film, but was not accepted as a nominee.

Main cast
Ulrich Noethen as Kurt
Heike Makatsch as Prinzessin
Jasmin Tabatabai as Billie
Rudolf Wessely as Newspaper Editor
Marcus Thomas as Karlchen

Main crew
Director Xavier Koller
Screenplay Stefan Kolditz
Music Kol Simcha

See also
Gripsholm Castle (1963 film)

Kurt Tucholsky
Cinema of Switzerland
List of submissions to the 73rd Academy Awards for Best Foreign Language Film

References

Printed media reviews
Cornelia Fleer. "Gripsholm" -- "film dienst" (Germany), Vol. 53, Iss. 23, 7 November 2000, Pg. 26 
Detlef Kühn. "Xavier Kollers kluge und einfühlsame Tucholsky-Biographie" -- "epd Film" (Germany), Vol. 17, Iss. 11, 1 November 2000, Pg. 34
Dominik Slappnig; et al. "Tucholskys Muse: Heike Makatsch in Xavier Kollers "Gripsholm" " -- Bern : Stämpfli, 2000.

External links

2000 films
2000 romantic drama films
German romantic drama films
Swiss romantic drama films
Swedish-language films
2000s German-language films
Films set in Sweden
Remakes of German films
Films based on German novels
Films set in 1932
Films about vacationing
Films directed by Xavier Koller
2000s German films